The 1989 World Series of Poker (WSOP) was a series of poker tournaments held at Binion's Horseshoe. The 1989 Main Event was won by 24-year-old Phil Hellmuth, defeating defending champion Johnny Chan, and also breaking the record for being the youngest player to win the WSOP Main Event (a record previously set by Stu Ungar in 1980). Had Chan won, he would have tied Johnny Moss's record of three Main Event wins. This year also marked the first year in which Moss did not finish any WSOP tournaments inside the payout positions.

Preliminary events

Main Event
There were 178 entrants to the main event. Each paid $10,000 to enter the tournament.

Final table

Other High Finishes
NB: This list is restricted to top 30 finishers with an existing Wikipedia entry.

World Series of Poker
World Series of Poker